Raiffeisen may refer to:

 Raiffeisen (Albania), a bank
 Raiffeisen (Switzerland), a bank
 Raiffeisenbank, cooperative banks in several European countries
 Friedrich Wilhelm Raiffeisen, the founder of the co-operative movement of credit unions